The Finals Day of the 2008 Twenty20 Cup comprised the semi-finals and final of the 2008 Twenty20 Cup. The matches were held on Saturday 26 July 2008 at the Rose Bowl in Southampton.

Middlesex and Kent qualified for the final at the expense of Durham and Essex respectively. Middlesex eventually emerged as champions by 3 runs, posting a score 187/6 and Kent could only make 184/5 in their 20 overs.

Semi-finals

1st Semi-Final

Kent Spitfires v Essex Eagles 

Kent progressed to the final after a 14-run victory in the first semi-final at the Rose Bowl. Having won the toss and electing to bat, openers Joe Denly and captain Robert Key compiled the opening fifty in just five overs. Key was first to fall, clean bowled to Danish Kaneria with the score on 58. Yasir Arafat was next in, and lasted 9 balls and 10 runs before falling to the same bowler. Denly top scored with 36, but he was the third man down, neatly stumped by James Foster. Most of the middle order chipped in with good runs, Martin van Jaarsveld with sixteen, Darren Stevens with 29 and Azhar Mahmood with 24. A late flourish from 2007 Finals Day hat-trick hero Ryan McLaren who faced just three balls for his unbeaten ten, as the Spitfires managed to compile a target of 174.

Essex's opening stand of Ravinder Bopara, who was top bowler in the Kent innings (3-36 off 4 overs) and Mark Pettini started very well, putting on 78 for the first wicket before Bopara was caught off the bowling of James Tredwell. The dangerous Graham Napier followed almost straight away, and the steady rate of wickets to fall continued to the end of the innings. Pettini was the top scorer, hitting a 47-ball 54 but with a lack of support, the Eagles were always going to fall short. Three run outs didn't help either as the Eagles' chance at the Stanford Super Series ended.

Second semi-final

Middlesex Crusaders v Durham Dynamos 

Middlesex put paid to the Dynamos' challenge with a convincing eight wicket win in the afternoon semi-final. Dale Benkenstein had won the toss and followed the earlier game in putting his own team in to bat first. Losing Michael Di Venuto for a third-ball duck didn't seem to help matters.  It was then left to Paul Collingwood, Shivnarine Chanderpaul and Will Smith to hit the runs. However, as the innings wore on, the conditions began to favour the slower bowlers. This was reflected in the bowling of Shaun Udal and Murali Kartik. In the eight overs that they bowled, only 36 runs were conceded. The Dynamos were thus limited to just 138 off their twenty overs, Chanderpaul top scoring with 48.

The Crusaders got off to a steady start with openers Billy Godleman and Ed Joyce, as they began to eke into the target. They had almost reached halfway by the time the first wicket fell. It was almost like London buses in that Middlesex went from 65 without loss, to 65 for 2 with the loss of Godleman for 20 and Joyce for 41. But no more wickets were to fall as an unbeaten partnership of 76 between Owais Shah and Tyron Henderson allowed the Crusaders to advance. Henderson kept much of the strike, hitting a quite superb unbeaten 59 off only 21 balls, including 7 sixes, of which 3 came in the one over. This earned him man of the match, and earned the Crusaders a spot in the Twenty20 Champions League.

Final - Kent Spitfires v Middlesex Crusaders

References

Finals Day, 2008 Twenty20 Cup
Twenty20 Cup Finals Day